Rumbek is the capital of Lakes State, central South Sudan, and the former capital of the country.

Location

Overview
Rumbek is the headquarters of Rumbek Central County and is the capital of Western Lakes State, one of the 28 states of South Sudan.  Following the peace agreement ending the Second Sudanese Civil War, the Sudanese People's Liberation Movement chose Rumbek to serve as the temporary administrative center of the Government of Southern Sudan. Later, Juba was selected to become the permanent capital. Like most South Sudanese towns, Rumbek suffered significant infrastructural damage during the civil war, in which an estimated 2 million people perished.

Population
In 2004, the United Nations (OCHA) estimated the population of "Rumbek County" at about 82,500. At that time, the Dinka Agar constituted about 60% of the population, 30% were Dinka Gok, 6% were Bongo and 4% were Jur-Bel. In 2011, the population of the town of Rumbek is estimated at about 32,100.

Transportation

The town of Rumbek is situated on the main road (A43) from Juba to the southeast to Wau to the northwest. There are two smaller roads out of town; one to Yirol to the east and another to Durbuoni to the north. Since 2005, some of the roads have undergone repairs. Rumbek is also served by Rumbek Airport. The main construction contractor in Rumbek, working on both the roads and the airport is Civicon Limited.

Climate
Like other parts of South Sudan and the East Sudanian savanna, Rumbek has a tropical savanna climate which borders on a hot semi-arid climate (Köppen Aw bordering on BSh), with a wet season and a dry season and the temperature being hot year-round. The hottest time of year is from February to May, just before the wet season starts.

Rumbek receives  of rain over 77.1 precipitation days, with a distinct wet and dry season like most tropical savanna climates. December receives no precipitation at all, with almost no rain falling from November to March. August, the wettest month, receives  of rainfall on average. August also has 13.9 precipitation days, which is the most of any month. Humidity is much higher in the wet season than the dry season, with February having a humidity at just 31% and August having a humidity at 74%. Rumbek receives 2675.7 hours of sunshine annually on average, with the sunshine being distributed fairly evenly across the year, although it is lower during the wet season. January receives the most sunshine, while June receives the least.

Points of interest
The following points of interest are found in or near Rumbek:
 The offices of Rumbek Town Council
 The headquarters of Rumbek Central County 
 The headquarters of Lakes State Administration
 Rumbek Holy Family Cathedral
 Rumbek Freedom Square - An outdoor venue in the middle of town for public and civic gatherings
 A branch of Kenya Commercial Bank (South Sudan)
 A branch of Nile Commercial Bank
 Salva Kiir Women International Hospital
 Lakes State Hospital - A public hospital administered by the Lakes State Government
 Rumbek Airport - A small airport with regular scheduled airline service and private air-charter providers
 Rumbek University - One of four public universities in South Sudan.

Notable people
Samuel Aru Bol, politician (1929-2000)
Gordon Muortat Mayen, politician (1922-2008)
 Manyang Mayom. Human Right Journalist. In August 2010 Mayom was awarded the Hellman/Hammett grant from Human Rights Watch award; HRW Banned, Censored, Harassed, and Jailed -Hellman/Hammett Grants Honor 42 Writers for Courage Facing Political Persecution. On 6 May 2013 Mayom was given an awarded by the South Sudan Red Cross for his coverage of the humanitarian situation in Jonglei state. Mayom was the first journalist to write direct to South Sudanese president Salva Kiir over youth being mistreated in military cell across South Sudan.

See also
 Rumbek Airport
 Lakes (state)
 Bahr el Ghazal

References

External links

 Location of Rumbek At GoogleMaps
 Thousands Celebrate Independence Day In Rumbek Freedom Square
 The Task of Rebuilding South Sudan

 
State capitals in South Sudan
Populated places in Lakes (state)